Freaky Friday is the soundtrack album to the 2003 Disney film of the same name which features songs by various artists. AllMusic called the album a "mixed bag", specifically praising American Hi-Fi's "The Art of Losing", The Donnas' "Backstage", Andrew W.K.'s "She Is Beautiful", and Joey Ramone's "What a Wonderful World", while strongly criticizing the rest of the album.

The album was certified gold by the RIAA in December 2003 for shipping over 500,000 copies. British girl-band Girls Aloud recorded "You Freak Me Out" for the film, which was intended to be added to the soundtrack; however, it was decided that the song would not be added to the album, but would instead be included on the re-release of the band's debut album, Sound of the Underground (2003).

Track listing
 Lindsay Lohan – "Ultimate"
 Simple Plan – "Happy Together"
 Lillix – "What I Like About You"
 American Hi-Fi – "The Art of Losing"
 Forty Foot Echo – "Brand New Day"
 Halo Friendlies – "Me vs. the World"
 Christina Vidal – "Take Me Away"
 Chad Michael Murray – "...Baby One More Time" (Intro)
 Bowling for Soup – "...Baby One More Time"
 The Donnas – "Backstage"
 Andrew W.K. – "She Is Beautiful"
 Diffuser – "I Wonder"
 Lash – "Beauty Queen"
 Ashlee Simpson – "Just Let Me Cry"
 Joey Ramone – "What a Wonderful World"
 Rolfe Kent – "Fortune Cookie?"

Charts

Weekly charts

Year-end charts

Certifications

Ultimate

"Ultimate" is a song from the Freaky Friday soundtrack, with clips of scenes from the film used to help promote it on Disney Channels Worldwide. It enjoyed some success due to airplay on Disney Channel and Radio Disney.

Background
Written and produced by Robert Ellis Orrall and Jeff Coplan, and played during the end credits of the film, the song was so successful on Radio Disney and Disney Channel, that it was included on the soundtrack of the series That's So Raven.

Music video
There are two different promotional music videos for the song. In the first (which appears on film), Lohan sings the song as her character Anna Coleman and her bandmates (played by Christina Vidal and Haley Hudson) perform it at her mother Tess's wedding. In the second version that appeared on Disney Channel, the video begins the same as the first one, at a wedding, before then transitioning to Lohan recording the song in a studio, with clips from the film interspersed throughout.

References

Disney film soundtracks
Freaky Friday
2003 soundtrack albums
Hollywood Records soundtracks
Fantasy film soundtracks
Comedy film soundtracks